The 1959 New Mexico A&M Aggies football team represented New Mexico State University in the Border Conference during the 1959 NCAA University Division football season. In their second year under head coach Warren B. Woodson, the Aggies compiled an 8–3 record (2–2 against conference opponents), finished in third place in the conference, and defeated North Texas State in the 1959 Sun Bowl.

The team's statistical leaders included Charley Johnson with 1,449 passing yards, Pervis Atkins with 971 rushing yards, and R. Cassell with 519 receiving yards. For the first time in what proved to be four consecutive years, a New Mexico State back won the NCAA rushing title, Pervis Atkins in 1959, Bob Gaiters in 1960, and Preacher Pilot in 1961 and 1962.

Head coach Warren Woodson was later inducted into the College Football Hall of Fame.

Schedule

References

New Mexico State Aggies
New Mexico State Aggies football seasons
Sun Bowl champion seasons
New Mexico State Aggies football